Zim Hip Hop Awards also known as Zimbabwe Hip Hop Awards (abbreviated as ZHHA) is an annual awards event created to recognise outstanding Zimbabwean hip hop artists in Zimbabwe as well as diaspora based hip hop artists. The awards are presented in December each year.

History
Zimbabwe Hip Hop Awards were established in December 2011 and the first edition was held at 7 Arts Theater in Harare becoming the first awards ceremony for hip hop artists in Zimbabwe. The awards have been key to putting Zimbabwean hip hop on the national and regional map.

Entry
For nomination, an artist’s music has to be released on radio or public media platforms from the previous cycle of November which runs to October in that current year. An artist must provide credible work and supporting articles as references to show actual release of material. The ZHHA panel will select nominees and the list of nominees is publicised in press a month before the event.

The awards are presented every second week of December and the winners' list is released to the press. Winners receive a framed plaque at the ceremony.

Categories
The ceremony presents 24 award categories.

Best Male 
Best Female 
Best Newcomer 
Best Hip-Hop Duo/Group 
Best Album  
Song of the year 
Best Producer  
Best Collaboration  
Best Brand Supporting Local HipHop 
Best Promoter  
Best Diaspora  
Best Radio DJ 	 
Best Club DJ 
Best Gospel Act 
Best Dance Act 
Best underground 
Best alternative 
Best Online Media 
Best Journalist. 
Video Of The Year & video director of the year 
Best hip hop hustle. 
Best hip hop verse (sweet 16 award) 
Hip hop personality of the year 
People’s choice

Awards editions
Zim Hip Hop Awards 2011, 7 Arts Theater, Harare
Zim Hip Hop Awards 2012, 7 Arts Theater, Harare
Zim Hip Hop Awards 2013, 7 Arts Theater, Harare
Zim Hip Hop Awards 2014, Wing Wah International, Harare
Zim Hip Hop Awards 2015, Club 1+1, Long Cheng Plaza, Harare
Zim Hip Hop Awards 2016, Club 1+1, Long Cheng Plaza, Harare
Zim Hip Hop Awards 2017, Zimbabwe Music Academy, Bulawayo
Zim Hip Hop Awards 2018, Pabloz, Sam Levy's Village, Harare
Zim Hip Hop Awards 2019, Club 1+1, Long Cheng Plaza, Harare
Zim Hip Hop Awards 2020, Rainbow Towers Hotel, Harare

Past winners

Special awards

Controversy
The Zim Hip Hop Awards has had some controversies surrounding its presentation and nomination criteria with several reporters and fans expressing concern when nominees are released.

References

Hip hop awards
African music awards
Awards established in 2011